John I, Prince of Anhalt-Bernburg (*1260 died 5 June 1291) was a German prince of the House of Ascania and ruler of the principality of Anhalt-Bernburg.

He was the eldest son of Bernhard I, Prince of Anhalt-Bernburg, by his wife Princess Sophie, daughter of King Abel of Denmark.

Life 
After the death of his father in 1287, John succeeded him as ruler of the Anhalt-Bernburg, but he had to rule jointly with his third brother, Bernhard II. The second brother, Albert, became a priest and renounced all his rights. Of the two youngest brothers, Henry also was ordained as priest and renounced his rights, whereas Rudolf was possibly dead by the time of his father's death.

John died unmarried and childless after four years of rule.  He was succeeded by his brother Bernhard II, who became sole ruler.

Princes of Anhalt-Bernburg
1291 deaths
Year of birth unknown